The 1988 United States Senate elections was an election for the United States Senate. Held on November 8, the 33 seats of Class 1 were contested in regular elections. In spite of the Republican victory by George H. W. Bush in the presidential election, the Democrats gained a net of one seat in the Senate. Seven seats changed parties, with four incumbents being defeated. The Democratic majority in the Senate increased by one to 55–to–45. 

This is the last Senate election in which California voted for a Republican and both Texas and Maine voted for Democrats, and the last time Arizona would do so until 2018. This would also be the last Senate election until 1998 to not have at least one special election during that cycle.

Results summary
Summary of the 1988 United States Senate election results

Source:

Gains and losses 

The Democrats captured four Republican seats: one open and three defeated incumbents, which were partially offset by the Republican capture of two open seats and the defeat of one Democratic incumbent.

Democratic gains
 Connecticut: Democratic attorney general Joe Lieberman narrowly defeated incumbent Lowell P. Weicker, Jr. (R) in his bid for a fourth term.  A liberal in an increasingly conservative party, Weicker found himself at odds with his fellow Republicans.  This rift would lead many conservatives (such as National Review editor William F. Buckley, Jr.) to endorse Lieberman, a moderate Democrat.
 Nebraska: Incumbent David Karnes (R) lost by a large margin to former governor Bob Kerrey (D).  Karnes had been appointed to the Senate following the death of Sen. Edward Zorinsky (D) and, though he survived a tough primary challenge from Rep. Hal Daub (R), he proved no match for the popular Kerrey in the general election.
 Nevada: Incumbent Chic Hecht (R) was narrowly defeated by Governor Richard Bryan (D).  Hecht had been considered vulnerable for his undistinguished record and a series of verbal gaffes.
 Virginia: Incumbent Paul S. Trible, Jr. (R) retired rather than run a contentious re-election race against former governor Chuck Robb (D).  Robb would instead face Republican Maurice Dawkins, a black minister, and defeat him in a landslide.

Republican gains
 Florida: Incumbent Lawton Chiles (D) retired rather than run for a fourth term.  Congressman Connie Mack III (R) overcame some concerns about his very conservative House record to defeat Rep. Buddy MacKay (D).
 Mississippi: Incumbent and Senate President pro tempore John C. Stennis (D) retired after 41 years in the Senate.  House Minority Whip Trent Lott (R) defeated Congressman Wayne Dowdy by a comfortable margin in the increasingly Republican Mississippi.
 Montana: Incumbent John Melcher (D) was defeated by Republican Conrad Burns.  A political novice, Burns would score an upset victory riding on the coattails of Bush's modest Montana victory.

Democratic holds
 New Jersey: Incumbent Frank Lautenberg (D) won re-election to a second term over Republican Wall Street executive and Heisman Trophy winner Pete Dawkins.  Lautenberg's campaign, led by James Carville and Paul Begala, attacked the once favored Dawkins as a carpetbagger (he moved to New Jersey from New York to make his Senate run) and opportunist.
 Wisconsin: Former state Democratic Party Chairman Herb Kohl defeated Republican state senator Susan Engeleiter for the seat of retiring incumbent William Proxmire (D).  Kohl capitalized on his popularity in the state as the heir to the department stores that bear his family's name and as owner of the Milwaukee Bucks NBA team.

Republican holds
 Washington: Former Sen. Slade Gorton (R) defeated Rep. Mike Lowry (D) for the seat of incumbent Daniel J. Evans (R).  Gorton won the tight race despite having been voted out of the state's other Senate seat two years earlier.
 Wyoming: Incumbent Malcolm Wallop (R) defeated Democratic state senator John Vinich by less than one percentage point.  Wallop became vulnerable due to attacks on his partisan voting record.

Change in composition

Before the elections

After the elections

Race summary

Special elections 
There were no special elections in 1988.

Elections leading to the next Congress 
In these general elections, the winners were elected for the term beginning January 3, 1989; ordered by state.

All of the elections involved the Class 1 seats.

Closest races 
In eleven races the margin of victory was under 10%.

Ohio was the tipping point state with a margin of 13.8%.

Arizona 

Incumbent Democrat Dennis DeConcini was reelected to a third term over Republican Keith DeGreen, Marine veteran and financial advisor.

California 

Incumbent Republican Pete Wilson won re-election to a second term over Democrat Leo T. McCarthy, Lieutenant Governor of California and former Speaker of the California State Assembly. As of 2020, this is the last Senate election in California won by a Republican.

Connecticut 

Incumbent Republican Lowell P. Weicker Jr. ran for re-election to a fourth term, but was defeated by Democratic candidate Joe Lieberman, the Connecticut Attorney General and eventual 2000 nominee for Vice President of the United States, who would remain in office until his retirement in 2013.

Delaware 

Incumbent Republican William Roth won re-election to a fourth term, beating Democrat Shien Biau Woo, Lieutenant Governor of Delaware

Florida 

Incumbent Democrat Lawton Chiles decided to retire instead of seeking a fourth term. Republican U.S. Representative Connie Mack III won the open seat over Democratic Congressman Buddy Mackay.

This senate election was heavily targeted by both parties. U.S. Representative Mack announced his candidacy back in October 1987. President  Ronald Reagan endorsed Mack in June 1988 to allow Mack to focus on the general election, and easily won the September 6 Republican primary against U.S. Attorney Robert Merkle. In May 1988, then-Congressman MacKay announced he would run for the open seat, and defeated Insurance Commissioner Bill Gunter in a close October 4 runoff election.

The general election soon became nasty, with Mackay portraying Mack as "extremist." Mack also attacked his opponent in television ads by connecting him to liberal Massachusetts Governor and Democratic presidential nominee Michael Dukakis. Mack had help from vice presidential candidate Dan Quayle. The election was so close there was a recount until Mackay conceded eight days after election day.

Hawaii 

Incumbent Democrat Spark Matsunaga won re-election to a third term, beating Republican cattle rancher Maria Hustace.

Indiana 

Incumbent Republican Richard Lugar was re-elected to a third term over Democratic attorney Jack Wickes.

Lugar, a popular incumbent, had token opposition in this election. An April 1988 poll showed that Lugar lead 65% to 23%. By June, Lugar raised over $2 million, while Wickes raised just over $100,000. Lugar agreed to debate Wickes on September 10, 1988.

Lugar won overall with two-thirds of the vote and won 91 of Indiana's 92 counties, Wickes won only the Democratic stronghold of Lake County.

Maine 

Incumbent Democrat George J. Mitchell won re-election to a second full term over Republican Jasper Wyman, leader of Maine Christian Civic League and businessman. As of 2020, this is the last Senate election in Maine won by a Democrat.

Maryland 

Incumbent Democratic Paul Sarbanes was reelected to a third term over Republican Alan Keyes, former Assistant Secretary of State for International Organization Affairs.

Massachusetts 

Incumbent Democrat Ted Kennedy won re-election to his sixth (his fifth full) term over Republican Joseph D. Malone.

Michigan 

Incumbent Democrat Don Riegle won re-election to a third term over Republican U.S. Congressman James Whitney Dunn.

Minnesota 

Incumbent Republican David Durenberger won re-election to his second full term, beating Democrat Skip Humphrey, the Minnesota Attorney General and former state senator.

Mississippi 

Incumbent Democrat John C. Stennis decided to retire instead of seeking an eighth term (and his seventh full term). Republican Trent Lott won the open seat, beating Democrat Wayne Dowdy, U.S. Congressman from the 4th district.

Missouri 

Incumbent Republican John Danforth won re-election over Democratic state senator and future Governor Jay Nixon.

Montana 

Incumbent John Melcher, who was first elected to the Senate in 1976 and was re-elected in 1982, ran for re-election. After winning the Democratic primary, he faced Yellowstone County Commissioner Conrad Burns in the general election, and in the general election a grueling campaign followed. Ultimately, Melcher was narrowly defeated in his bid for re-election by Burns.

Nebraska 

Republican David Karnes decided to seek election to his first complete term after being appointed to the seat of the late Edward Zorinsky in March 1987, but was soundly defeated by Democratic former governor Bob Kerrey in the November general election.

Nevada 

Incumbent Republican Chic Hecht ran for re-election to a second term, but lost to Democratic governor Richard Bryan.

New Jersey 

Incumbent Democrat Frank Lautenberg won re-election to a second term with a margin of 8.37% over Republican Pete Dawkins, military veteran and CEO of Primerica Financial Services, Inc.

The campaign was full of political mudslinging, with Lautenberg accusing Dawkins of being a carpetbagger, noting his very brief residency in the state, and also accusing Dawkins' campaign of lying about his war record. Dawkins accused Lautenberg of running a smear campaign against, called him a "swamp dog", and criticized him for saying he voted eight times against a senatorial pay raise without mentioning the fact that he did vote once for the pay raise.

New Mexico 

Incumbent Democrat Jeff Bingaman won re-election to a second term, beating Republican New Mexico State Senator Bill Valentine.

New York 

Incumbent Democrat Daniel Patrick Moynihan won re-election to a third term, over Republican Robert R. McMillan, business executive of Avon Products and Reagan Administration advisor.

North Dakota 

The incumbent, Quentin Burdick of the North Dakota Democratic NPL Party, sought and received re-election to his sixth term, defeating Republican candidate Earl Strinden.

Only Burdick filed as a Dem-NPLer, and the endorsed Republican candidate was Earl Strinden of Grand Forks, North Dakota, who was President of the University of North Dakota Alumni Association. As in the Burdick's previous re-election campaign, the senator's age became an issue for voters as he was 80 years old during the campaign. However, challenger Strinden commented that he did not want to raise the age issue. Burdick and Strinden won the primary elections for their respective parties.

The Burdick campaign hired high-profile Washington, D.C. campaign consultant Bob Squire of Squire Eskew Communications.  To counter the potential age issue, Burdick successfully focused the message on the "clout" he had earned over decades in the Senate, as well as his Chairmanship of Senate Agricultural Appropriations sub-committee and his Chairmanship of the Senate Environment and Public Works Committee.

One independent candidate, Kenneth C. Gardner, also filed before the deadline, officially calling himself a libertarian. Gardner had previously run for North Dakota's other United States Senate seat an independent in 1974, challenging Milton Young. He only received 853 votes in that election.

Ohio 

Incumbent Democrat Howard Metzenbaum won re-election over George Voinovich, Mayor of Cleveland and former Lieutenant Governor of Ohio.

Pennsylvania 

Incumbent Republican H. John Heinz III successfully sought re-election to another term, defeating Democratic nominee Joe Vignola, Philadelphia City Controller.

Joe Vignola was not expected by Democratic Party leaders to have a substantial chance at defeating the popular incumbent John Heinz, even predicting that Vignola would become "Heinz's 58th variety," referring to an advertising slogan of the H. J. Heinz Company. Heinz, knowing this, ran a low-profile re-election campaign and was safely ahead in polling. Vignola traveled across Pennsylvania promoting an increase in domestic spending, including education and healthcare, while decreasing the defense budget to compensate. Vignola ran a positive campaign, in contrast with Cyril Wecht six years previously, although many Democratic ward leaders and committee members had given up on the campaign and had stopped campaigning for Vignola.

Heinz easily defeated Vignola to win the election and another term in the Senate, carrying every Pennsylvania county except Philadelphia, Vignola's home town, and by a comfortable 1.49 million vote margin. Heinz performed well in suburban areas, as well as the central, southwestern and northeastern portions of the state. Outside of Philadelphia, Vignola's best county-wide showing was in Mercer County, where he won 36% of the vote, and his poorest county-wide performance was in Snyder County, where he won 12% of the vote. Although Heinz's landslide victory was largely expected among Democratic leaders, Heinz won by a wide margin despite the Democrats' 551,000-voter registration advantage statewide.

Heinz died in an airplane crash on April 4, 1991, in Lower Merion Township, Pennsylvania. Democrat Harris Wofford was appointed on May 8 to fill the vacancy caused by Heinz's death, and subsequently won a special election in November 1991. In the 1994 election, however, Wofford was defeated by Republican Rick Santorum.

Rhode Island 

Incumbent Republican John Chafee won re-election to a third term, beating Democratic lieutenant governor and former state senator Richard Licht.

Tennessee 

Incumbent Democrat Jim Sasser won re-election to a third term over Republican Bill Anderson.

Texas 

Incumbent Democrat Lloyd Bentsen won re-election to a fourth term defeating Republican Representative Beau Boulter.

Bentsen easily won the Democratic nomination for another term, while Boulter came through a run-off in the Republican primary defeating Wes Gilbreath. After being nominated for the senate Bentsen was chosen by Michael Dukakis as his vice-presidential running mate and therefore ran for both the Senate and the vice-presidency at the same time. Bentsen was always the favorite for the senate election and won with 59.2% of the vote, compared to 40% for Boulter.

As of 2020, this was the last time a Democrat won a United States Senate election in Texas.

In the Democratic primary Democratic senator Lloyd Bentsen defeated the same opponent he had beaten in 1982, Joe Sullivan, a psychology professor from San Antonio.

Bentsen had been senator from Texas since first winning election in 1970 and had been re-elected in 1976 and 1982. He was also Chairman of the Senate Finance Committee and the clear favourite for re-election in 1988. Sullivan stood on a platform calling for reduced spending by the federal government, but had been easily defeated by Bentsen in the 1982 Democratic primary. This was repeated in 1988 with Bentsen winning the primary with over 80% of the vote.

Four candidates competed for the Republican nomination; U.S. representative Beau Boulter, former state representative Milton Fox, millionaire Houston businessman Wes Gilbreath and businessman Ned Snead. Boulter was a two-term representative for the 13th district, while Gilbreath was competing in his first election, but spent $500,000 on the primary.

Wes Gilbreath led in the March primary with 36.7%, but as no candidate won a majority, went into a run-off election against Beau Boulter who came second with 30.5%.

There were few policy differences between Boulter and Gilbreath, with both candidates being conservatives who opposed abortion and called for reduced government spending. Gilbreath spent about one million dollars of his money in his contest for the primary, while Boulter spent about $250,000. However Boulter won endorsements from many Texas Republican leaders, including the candidates who had come third and fourth in the March primary, as well as from anti-abortion groups.

Boulter won the April run-off for the Republican nomination with just over 60% of the vote.

In July 1988 the Democratic presidential nominee Michael Dukakis chose Lloyd Bentsen to be the Democratic vice-presidential candidate. As the Texas Democrats had already had their primary for senate candidate, Bentsen could not be replaced on the ballot. Bentsen was however able to run both for the Senate and for vice-president as Lyndon Johnson had gotten Texas law changed in 1960 to allow Johnson to do the same at the 1960 election.

Lloyd Bentsen won the senate election by a clear margin over Beau Boulter, at the same time as he and Michael Dukakis lost the presidential race,  with George Bush winning Texas with 56% of the vote compared to 43% for Dukakis. Bentsen's vote total in the senate election was reported to be at the time the highest vote total in any Texas statewide election. Bentsen then returned to the Senate and remained until the next four years when he was appointed the Secretary of the Treasury under President Bill Clinton. Had the Dukakis–Bentsen ticket won, Bentsen would have become U.S. Vice President and forced to resign his Senate seat, which would have led to a 1990 special election. It would also have led Republican Governor Bill Clements to temporarily appoint an interim replacement.

Utah  

Incumbent Orrin Hatch easily won re-election to a third term over Democrat Brian Moss.

Vermont 

Incumbent Republican Robert Stafford did not run for re-election to another term in the United States Senate. Republican candidate Jim Jeffords defeated Democratic candidate Bill Gray to succeed him.

Virginia 

Former Democratic governor Chuck Robb replaced Republican Senator Paul S. Trible Jr., who opted not to run for re-election.  Robb beat Republican Maurice A. Dawkins, minister and black activist.

Washington 

Incumbent Republican Daniel J. Evans decided to retire instead of running for re-election to a full term, after being appointed to the seat in 1983, and won re-election to a partial term that same year. Republican former U.S. Senator Slade Gorton, who had just lost a re-election bid in 1986, won the open seat over congressman Mike Lowry.

West Virginia 

Incumbent Democrat Robert Byrd won re-election to a sixth term over Republican, State Senator Jay Wolfe.

Wisconsin 

Incumbent Democrat William Proxmire decided to retire, instead of running for re-election to a sixth full term. Democratic businessman Herb Kohl won the open seat, beating Republican state senator Susan Engeleiter.

Wyoming 

Incumbent Republican Malcolm Wallop ran for re-election to a fourth term, and was narrowly re-elected, defeating the Democratic state senator John Vinich by a margin of a little over 1,300 votes.

Despite being a reliably Republican state, Vinich, a Democrat, was able to impressively compete with Wallop. During the campaign, Wallop attacked Vinich as being a tax-and-spend liberal who was beholden to labor and anti-business. Vinich, in turn, cited his "A" score he got from the National Rifle Association due to his votes in the Wyoming Legislature to counter Wallop's attacks, and possibly attract conservative voters.

See also 
 1988 United States elections
 1988 United States gubernatorial elections
 1988 United States presidential election
 1988 United States House of Representatives elections
 100th United States Congress
 101st United States Congress

Notes

References

External links 
 Complete election results at: